Charmian Clift (30 August 19238 July 1969) was an Australian writer and essayist. She was the second wife and literary collaborator of George Johnston.

Biography
Clift was born in Kiama, New South Wales in 1923.  She married George Johnston in 1947.  They had three children, the eldest of whom was the poet Martin Johnston.  After Clift and Johnston's collaboration High Valley (1949) won them recognition as writers, they left Australia with their young family, working in London before relocating to the Greek island of Kalymnos and later Hydra to try living by the pen. She met the songwriter Leonard Cohen whilst there in 1960.

Johnston returned to Australia to receive the accolades of his Miles Franklin Award-winner My Brother Jack.  Clift moved back to Sydney with their children in 1964, after which her memoirs Mermaid Singing and Peel Me a Lotus and her novel Honour's Mimic became successes.

She was also well known for the 240 essays she wrote between 1964 and 1969 for The Sydney Morning Herald and The Herald in Melbourne. They were collected in the books Images in Aspic and The World of Charmian Clift. In the meantime, Clift and Johnston's marriage was disintegrating under the pressures of their drinking habits and the problems their children had settling into life in Sydney.

On 8 July 1969, the eve of the publication of Johnston's novel Clean Straw for Nothing, Clift committed suicide by taking an overdose of barbiturates in Mosman, a Sydney suburb, while considerably affected by alcohol. Academics Paul Genoni and Tanya Dalziell suggest in their 2018 book Half the Perfect World that it was the impending publication of Johnston's novel, which Clift knew would lay bare her infidelities whilst on the island of Hydra, which prompted her to suicide. In her posthumously published article My Husband George in that month's edition of POL magazine, she wrote:

Her ashes were later scattered in the rose garden of the Northern Suburbs Crematorium in Sydney.

Bibliography

Novels 
 High Valley (with George Johnston), 1949
 The Big Chariot (with Johnston), 1953
 The Sponge Divers (with Johnston), 1955
 Walk to the Paradise Gardens, 1960
 Honour's Mimic, 1964

Short stories and collections 
 Strong Man from Piraeus and Other Stories, (with Johnston) 1983

Autobiography 
 Mermaid Singing, Indianapolis, 1956
 Peel Me a Lotus, London, 1959

Non-fiction 
 Images in Aspic, Selected Essays, Sydney, 1965
 The World of Charmian Clift, Sydney, 1970
 Trouble in Lotus Land, Sydney, 1990
 Being Alone with Oneself, Sydney, 1991
 Charmian Clift: Selected Essays, 2001

References

Further reading
Brown, M. 2004, Charmian and George, Rosenberg, Sydney.

Genoni, Paul and Tanya Dalziell Half the Perfect World: Writers, Dreamers and Drifters on Hydra, 1955–1964 Monash University Press, 2018. 
Wheatley, N. 2001, The Life and Myth of Charmian Clift, Flamingo (HarperCollins), Sydney.

External links
 Charmian Clift Website
 

1923 births
1969 suicides
Australian women novelists
Australian essayists
Drug-related suicides in Australia
Suicides in New South Wales
20th-century Australian novelists
20th-century Australian women writers
Australian women essayists
20th-century essayists
Greek people of Australian descent
Naturalized citizens of Greece
20th-century Australian journalists
Barbiturates-related deaths
The Argus (Melbourne) people